Sandra Windland "Wendy" Smith Rice (January 19, 1970 – May 31, 2005) was an American nature and animal photographer.

Biography
Sandra Windland Smith-Rice was the first child of Frederick W. Smith, founder of FedEx and Linda Smith Grisham McFarland. She had five sisters and three brothers, including Arthur Smith, the current head coach of the Atlanta Falcons. FedEx's first plane in 1973 was named "Wendy" after her. She was born on 19 January 1970 in Little Rock, Arkansas.

She graduated from St. Mary's Episcopal School in Memphis, Tennessee and studied drama at Duke University.  She pursued an acting career in Hollywood; she had two minor movie roles and two roles television episodes over a span of about three years.

Rice became a nature photographer, completing commissions for organizations such as Fujifilm, the National Geographic Society, and Nature's Best Photography magazine.  Her work won several awards and has been exhibited in the Smithsonian Museum of Natural History. Nature's Best Photography's annual Windland Smith Rice Awards are named after her.  She served on the Nature's Best Photography board and was the Master of Ceremonies Master  for Nature's Best Photography Awards events. She was known for her encouragement of other photographers.

Her interest in working with wildlife was exemplified by her membership on the board of the Earthfire Institute, an organization "dedicated to protecting wildlife by creating a bridge between humans, and animals in the wild," by rescuing animals that can no longer live in the wild.

Rice died suddenly in Memphis, Tennessee, on May 31, 2005, of Long QT Syndrome Type 2 while visiting her mother, Linda.  The Mayo Clinic opened the Windland Smith Rice Sudden Death Genomics Laboratory to study this and similar diseases. Her family and friends established a memorial fund in her name under the Sudden Arrythmia Death Syndromes Foundation. Rice's sister, Molly Smith, dedicated the 2007 movie P.S. I Love You in her memory.

A portfolio of Rice's nature pictures of Yellowstone are featured in the Memphis Zoo's Teton Trek.

References

General references

 

1970 births
2005 deaths
American women photographers
Nature photographers
20th-century American women artists
21st-century American women